Hapoel Beit She'an is an Israeli football club based in Beit She'an. The club spent several seasons in the top division in the 1990s, but after several relegations, folded in 2006, and was refounded in 2009.

History
The club was founded in 1953, and was renamed Hapoel Beit She'an/Sde Nahum in 1969, as it merged with Hapoel Sde Nahum, which played in Liga Bet, but reverted to their old name two years later. They remained in Liga Bet until 1976 when they were promoted to Liga Alef, and in 1978, to Liga Artzit, then the second tier. The club was relegated back to Liga Alef at the end of the 1983–84 season, but returned to Liga Artzit in 1986. Although they were relegated again, they returned to the second tier in 1993 under the management of Elisha Levy. In 1993–94 they finished second, and were promoted to Liga Leumit (then the top division) for the first time.

Following promotion, the club played its first four home matches in Tiberias whilst their stadium was upgraded. In their first season in Liga Leumit the club survived on the final day of the season, coming from 2–0 down to Maccabi Haifa (who were playing to win the title) to win 3–2. A film was made about the campaign, entitled Underdogs: A War Story.

Levy left the club in 1995 but returned in 1997. On 2 May 1998 the club played Beitar Jerusalem (a match held at Kiryat Eliezer in Haifa on police advice) in a game that became known as the "Shoelaces Match", as Beit She'an were accused of allowing Beitar to win the match (and the title).

After several lower mid-table finishes, Hapoel were relegated at the end of the 1998–99 season. In 2001–02 they finished bottom of the second tier, and were relegated again. A third relegation occurred in 2003–04, this time to Liga Alef. At the end of the 2005–06 season they were relegated from Liga Alef, and folded, although the club's youth teams were still active.

In 2009 the club merged with Hapoel Kvalim Mesilot to form Hapoel Beit She'an Mesilot, which took Mesilot's place in Liga Bet. A year later the team absorbed the local rival Maccabi Beit Shean, which gave up its place in Liga Bet. The club was promoted to Liga Alef after winning Liga Bet North B division.

Current squad
As of 6 February 2020

Honours

League

Cup competitions

References

External links
Hapoel Beit She'an Mesilot Israel Football Association 

Beit She'an
Beit She'an
Beit She'an
Association football clubs established in 1953
Association football clubs disestablished in 2009
1953 establishments in Israel
2009 disestablishments in Israel